Judy Kiyeng (born 10 December 1993) is a Kenyan middle-distance runner. She competed in the women's 1500 metres at the 2017 World Championships in Athletics.

References

External links

1993 births
Living people
Kenyan female middle-distance runners
World Athletics Championships athletes for Kenya
Place of birth missing (living people)